Atlus West, formerly known as Atlus U.S.A., Inc., is the North American publishing branch of Japanese video game company Atlus, primarily known for localizing games for both them and other third-party developers. Its first original role-playing game was Revelations: Persona on the PlayStation, described by staff as an attempt to break into the Western role-playing game market and establish the company's Megami Tensei franchise through its Persona sub-series.

The company was officially founded in 1991 as a North American publishing branch for Atlus to break into the role-playing video game market at the time. In November 2013, Atlus USA was restructured to be governed under Sega of America after Sega Sammy acquired their parent company through Index Corporation. Despite the publishing divisions merging, Sega and Atlus continued to operate as separate entities, with all existing Atlus franchises remaining under their pre-established Atlus brand.

Atlus West is notable in its localization approach in preserving as much of the original material as possible, including any cultural references. Outside of being the American publishing subsidiary for the Japanese parent developer, Atlus West acts as an English localizer and publisher for Japanese games, similarly to Aksys Games, NIS America, and Xseed Games. In addition to their own properties, Atlus West's localization and publishing efforts has introduced several notable third-party games to the West including Demon's Souls and the Ogre Battle and Guilty Gear series.

History

Origins and name 

Atlus Co., Ltd, a Japanese game developer founded in 1986, had been publishing its own games in its native country since the release of Puzzle Boy in 1989. Its North American branch was first established in Irvine, California on January 18, 1991, under the name Atlus Software, but traces its origins as Asuka Technologies founded on February 27, 1989. The branch was eventually succeeded by Atlus USA on April 1, 1999, becoming a separate subsidiary to Atlus. At the time of its inauguration in 1999, Atlus USA was owned at 85.7% by the Japanese parent company, with the remaining stock being shared among four employees. Atlus USA was formed because Atlus wanted to establish a local company in the United States. In 2010, Atlus' then-owner Index Corporation renamed Atlus USA to Index Digital Media and dissolved its Japanese parent company. The Atlus brand was preserved for Index's video games. In 2014, one year after Index Corporation was purchased by Sega, Index Digital Media reverted to being Atlus USA. Between 2019 and 2020, Atlus USA changed its public brand name to Atlus West.

Notable staff 
The current president is Naoto Hiraoka (who is also the Senior Vice President for Sega of America publishing). One of the previous public relations managers was John Hardin, while one of the original staff members was market manager Gail Salamanca. Several personnel have had recurring roles during the history of Atlus USA from their work on both Atlus products and third-party games. A major contributor is Yu Namba, general localization project leader. Namba joined Atlus USA following the release of Revelations: Persona in 1996, and his first work was for Persona 2: Eternal Punishment. He would later work on the later Persona games, and multiple Megami Tensei games including Shin Megami Tensei: Nocturne and the Digital Devil Saga duology. Another key member for some time was Nich Maragos: formerly a journalist working at 1UP.com, he joined Atlus USA's localization team in 2006 where his first projects were the third Devil Summoner game Raidou Kuzunoha vs. The Soulless Army and Persona 3 FES. He worked on the greater majority of games localized during the following nine years before moving to work for Nintendo Treehouse prior to 2016. Other prominent staff include Bill Alexander, a vice president of Atlus USA who was project leader on Odin Sphere; Tomm Hulett, who worked on the Digital Devil Saga duology, Stella Deus: The Gate of Eternity, and was project leader for Trauma Center: Under the Knife; and Mike Meeker, who acted as editor for both Persona 4 and Odin Sphere.

Localization approach 
The branch's stated aim was to publish high-quality Japanese games in North America. While Atlus had become famous in Japan for the Megami Tensei role-playing franchise, the series was deemed too dark to be released overseas despite a recognized market: a major part of this was their use of religious imagery and taboo, which ran counter to potential publishers' content guidelines for overseas releases. It was eventually decided to bring over entries from the franchise to help establish Atlus in the West, as they did not have a role-playing series to compete with other major series such as Final Fantasy, Suikoden and Breath of Fire.

When Atlus USA first localized Revelations: Persona, the first role-playing game localized by the team, was handled by a small staff of six full-time employees, meaning that localizing the game was a huge task. The staff was later expanded, although they would be affected by staff and resource limitations for other early projects. Since the release of Persona 2: Eternal Punishment in 1999, Atlus has adopted a policy of keeping their localizations as close as possible to the original Japanese versions, a tradition they have followed to the present day. The first mainline game to be released in the West was Shin Megami Tensei: Nocturne in 2004. It was decided based upon the success of mature Western games such as the Grand Theft Auto series. As per their resolution, they kept it as close as possible to the original, consulting the Japanese guides and game source code so they would not make mistakes with demon names.

Following the release of Shin Megami Tensei: Nocturne, the "Shin Megami Tensei" moniker was attached to games released in the West across the core games and its various subseries. This was done to help with marketing, and worked in their favor due to all their selected games being part of the wider Megami Tensei series. For some games, such as entries in the Persona series, the moniker has been dropped. A notable exception from Atlus' localization history is the massively multiplayer online role-playing game Shin Megami Tensei: Imagine, which was localized by Aeria Games, who consulted with Atlus to make sure their work was faithful to the series.

The first stage of Atlus' localization process is familiarization with the game. The time the developers can access the game varies, with this stage beginning after completion of the master version for in-house products and after release for third-party games. The project leader receives all text files and relevant graphic assets while the translators play the game itself in its unlocalized form. This approach is vital as, from the main scenario to potential side quests or other smaller narrative elements, it was important to know context and point-of-view so they could be accurately localized. The localization process begins after this, taking varying lengths of time depending on the project: some took a very short time, while others required several months work. If there is voiced dialogue, the English voice recording can further extend the process. The programming stage, where the localized assets are inserted into the game, is given to the original developers as Atlus USA have no in-house programmers. After this comes the quality assurance (QA) testing, necessary to find and correct any bugs or text typos that occurred during the programming stage. Finally the game is sent for manufacturer approval, before moving to manufacturing. Further programming and QA work may be needed if the manufacturer is unsatisfied, and the manufacturing process can take varying amounts of time based on the game's medium. Their QA process was reassessed following the release of Shin Megami Tensei IV: Apocalypse in 2016, which had unlocalized text which appeared under certain circumstances. For games developed by other companies, Atlus USA also makes inquiries about the game's availability for licensing, then purchase an import copy, and if they are impressed make a pitch to the game's developers.

The Digital Devil Saga duology was the first Megami Tensei product to make extensive use of voice acting. As the Japanese version used famous Japanese actors, the localization team picked well-known English voice actors for the lead roles, and took extra care lip-synching the English dialogue. For voice acting, the team tried to choose actors who could properly and accurately portray the characters, and sometimes made additions to better distinguish the characters in a way understandable to a Western audience. A cited example was the Digital Devil Saga duology, where character Cielo was given a Jamaican accent to help portray his easy-going and friendly personality. Atlus USA tries to keep voice actors consistent between games which use the same cast of characters, but when a voice actor is unavailable, they will recast with an actor who sounds as close as possible to the original so there is minimal disruption to continuity.

Changes 
Despite their dominant policy of keeping games intact when translating from Japanese to English, some concessions have needed to be made with releases. When discussing the differences between localizing Shin Megami Tensei IV and the mobile port of the original Shin Megami Tensei, Nich Maragos said that while Shin Megami Tensei IV had a dialogue-driven story, Shin Megami Tensei used briefer and more to-the-point dialogue, in addition to having a strict character limit for dialogue boxes, making the latter a more challenging project. Shin Megami Tensei: Strange Journey was the first game to be developed with a Western audience in mind, which changed how the team were required to approach the localization. For the third Devil Summoner, the localization team added 1920s slang  to the script so its setting in a fictionalized version of the Taishō period would sound authentic. They also removed a mahjong minigame as there was no tutorial for players unfamiliar with the game, and its rewards for playing were meager.

The most information about the difficulties of localization have been for the Persona series. Revelations: Persona, the first role-playing game localized by the team, was handled by a small staff of six full-time employees, meaning that localizing the game was a huge task. They were also faced with the problem of the numerous Japanese cultural references the game contained. Nearly all references to Japanese culture were removed, with the setting changing from Japan to North America. This meant that the names and ethnicity of all character were altered, with the most notable being the character Masao Inaba being turned from a Japanese to an African American boy named Mark. Revelations: Persona has become notorious for the number of changes made to the game's content for its Western release. Atlus USA's next original game, Persona 2: Eternal Punishment, was described as a "halfway point" in their localization style: while they kept as faithful as possible to the original script, they needed to take the alterations to Revelations: Persona into account for character names. The first Persona game was later remade, and this allowed the staff to completely redo the localization, changing everything to be more faithful to the original with the exception of a few fan favorites.

For Persona 3 and Persona 4, Japanese honorifics were retained despite it being a contentious decision among fans. Humor that was focused on a knowledge of Japanese culture also needed to be either changed completely, or adjusted so that it would be understandable. In Persona 3, references to the first Shin Megami Tensei were changed to those of the first two localized Persona games. Some issues with language have caused changes to be made: Persona 3 character Mitsuru Kirijo's second language was changed from English to French, and class questions based around language needed to be entirely redone. Some character names were altered, such as the stagename of Persona 4 character Rise Kujikawa. For Persona 4 Golden, an expanded remake of Persona 4, the main trouble was finding a suitable voice actress for new character Marie. For Persona Q: Shadow of the Labyrinth, this approach was taken, and added dialogue was inserted to explain aspects of the game's fourth dungeon, which was themed around a Japanese culture festival.

For games outside the Megami Tensei franchises, changes have been less prominent due to many of their games taking place in fictional universes without references to popular culture. The script for Odin Sphere was inspired by the work of William Shakespeare, but the team were faced with difficulties with the auto-scrolling dialogue and text bubbles. When recording, the voice actors needed to time their performances to the scrolling dialogue, and the text bubbles needed to be individually resized while also keeping the English translation as close and concise as possible. 3D Dot Game Heroes required little to no changes, as its original script was already replete with Easter eggs and references to the classic video games it was giving homage to. Stella Deus also underwent minimal alterations, including preserving the story's religious themes.

Publishing 

During its early lifetime, before it had fully established itself, Atlus USA was a third-party publisher for Sony, Nintendo and Sega for their respective home console systems. Their first Megami Tensei release was the action spin-off Jack Bros.; their first role-playing release was Revelations: Persona for the PlayStation. The next original game to be released by Atlus USA was Persona 2: Eternal Punishment: its prequel Innocent Sin was considered, but workload and content issues meant that it remained exclusive to Japan. Despite fan demand, the greater majority of Atlus' early games remain exclusive to Japan due to their age and the company wishing to focus on their latest games.

In addition to their own franchises such as Megami Tensei and Trauma Center, the company notably localised several third-party series and individual games. These include Ogre Battle from Quest Corporation, Baroque from Sting Entertainment, the original Guilty Gear by Arc System Works, and Demon's Souls by FromSoftware. Despite their wide reputation for publishing role-playing games, they have also branched out into other genres with games such as Galleon. Two games that the company localized but did not publish were Disgaea: Hour of Darkness and Phantom Brave: while they handled localization and sales distribution, the game's original Japanese developers and publishers Nippon Ichi Software handled Western publicity and publishing. The reverse has also been done; Lunacy, for example, was translated and localized by Sega of America, but licensed to Atlus USA for publication and marketing in North America. A different notable third-party game was Citizens of Earth, an independent game developed by Eden Industries that was picked up by Atlus following difficulties securing funding for the game. A similar event was when Atlus picked up Demon's Souls for publication after the game was rejected for Western publication by Sony Computer Entertainment. A recurring partner is Vanillaware: their first game, Odin Sphere, was published in 2007. Atlus later picked up the publishing rights to Dragon's Crown after original publisher UTV Ignition Entertainment ran into financial trouble. As part of their agreement to publish Dragon's Crown, Atlus had right of first refusal for Vanillaware's next game, and they ended up publishing the company's sci-fi game 13 Sentinels: Aegis Rim.

Before 2017, Atlus did not have a European branch, meaning that their games were released through third-party publishers, which has in turn traditionally resulted in delays of at least several months between the European and North American releases. The first Atlus game to be published in Europe was Shin Megami Tensei: Nocturne followed by the Digital Devil Saga duology. These games were published by Ghostlight, who would go on to publish other games including Devil Survivor and its sequel. Other later publishing partners include Koei (Devil Summoner: Raidou Kuzunoha vs. The Soulless Army, Persona 3); Square Enix (Odin Sphere, Persona 4); 505 Games (Stella Deus); NIS America (Persona 4 Golden, Persona Q, Odin Sphere Leifthrasir); Deep Silver (Persona 5, Shin Megami Tensei IV: Apocalypse); and Namco Bandai Games (Demon's Souls). Despite lacking a European branch for some time, Atlus has published games digitally in Europe, including the remake of the first Persona, Persona 4 Arena and Aquria-developed game The Caligula Effect. A European branch was finally opened within Sega of Europe's offices in 2017, allowing them to release special editions of their properties directly in Europe.

Third-party games published

References

External links 
 

American companies established in 1991
Video game companies of the United States
Video game companies established in 1991
Video game publishers
Sega Sammy Holdings
American subsidiaries of foreign companies
Companies based in Irvine, California
1991 establishments in California